The Men's 5 km competition of the 2020 European Aquatics Championships was held on 12 May 2021.

Results
The race was started at 14:45.

References

Men's 5 km